Goran Ivanišević and Marc Rosset were the defending champions, but did not participate in 1993.

Todd Woodbridge and Mark Woodforde won the title, defeating John Fitzgerald and Laurie Warder 6–4, 7–5 in the final.

Seeds

  Todd Woodbridge /  Mark Woodforde (champions)
  John Fitzgerald /  Laurie Warder (final)
  David Adams /  Jonathan Stark (first round)
  Mike Briggs /  Trevor Kronemann (quarterfinals)

Draw

Draw

References

External links
 Draw

Doubles